In the context of the law of the Netherlands, the term gedogen (toleration, although gedogen does not literally mean toleration; one can describe it best as toleration in law) refers to not enforcing certain laws. The Dutch government tolerates some offences. Some things like possessing small amounts of cannabis are formally forbidden by law, but the Dutch government abstains from bringing criminal charges against the offenders. Often these policies are brought about by a tension between treaty obligations and domestic politics. See policies on cannabis and euthanasia for more information.

To give an example in layman's terms: a mother may tell her child he cannot have cookies from the cookie jar. The father, regardless of his beliefs, cannot tell the child it is okay to have a cookie as that would result in a conflict with the mother. If the father sees the child taking a cookie anyway, he may choose not to say anything. He may not want to punish or stop the child, but cannot condone the behavior either. The father may act as if nothing had happened to avoid a conflict with both his beliefs and the mother. He tolerates (Dutch "gedoogt") the behavior.

The statutes describe it as "The basis for the 'gedoog' policy is the consideration of interests in which the interest of law enforcement needs to yield to an identifiable greater cause. It is a positive decision not to pursue and prosecute regardless of available law enforcement capacity." (translated)

Further reading

References

Law of the Netherlands
Dutch words and phrases